Howard Gentry Jr., born February 4, 1954, serves the Metropolitan Government of Nashville as the Criminal Court Clerk of Davidson County in the Twentieth Judicial District. He was appointed to the position in 2011 and reelected, without opposition, in 2012. A Nashville native, Gentry has been elected three times to countywide public office including the position of Vice Mayor of Nashville. 

His father, Howard C. Gentry, was head football coach and Athletic Director at Tennessee A&I State College—now known as Tennessee State University.

Education
Howard Gentry earned his B.S., Health, Physical Education, and Recreation; and M.A., Education degrees from Tennessee State University.

Career
Upon graduation from Tennessee State University, Howard Gentry became a member of the TSU football and basketball radio broadcast team, serving as color commentator from 1974 to 1986. Afterward he entered the field of banking, spending three years at First American Bank, then five years at Citizens Bank, both in Nashville, from the mid-1970s through the early 1980s.  He next worked in automotive sales before taking the position of Court Officer and Law Clerk with Nashville Metropolitan Criminal Court Division I, from 1987 to 1990. His next career move was to return to Tennessee State University, where he was appointed to be Director of Development and Executive Director of the TSU Foundation in 1991, then Director of Athletics in 1994.

Following his time at TSU Mr. Gentry was a Metro Nashville Council member-at-large before being elected Metro Nashville-Davidson County’s first African American vice mayor. He was re-elected in 2003. In 2007, Gentry was a candidate for Mayor and narrowly missed the run-off by less than 300 votes. 

Howard Gentry currently serves as the Metropolitan Government of Nashville as the Criminal Court Clerk of Davidson County in the Twentieth Judicial District.

Mayoral Appointments
Communities Putting Prevention to Work Leadership Team, Advisory Council for Adult Literacy, Advisory Council on Early Childhood Development and Early Education, and Advisory Group on Sustainable Healthcare Services to Underserved and Indigent Citizens.

Voting Rights
Gentry and his staff at the Davidson County Criminal Court work to streamline the process for restoring the voting rights of felons. His staff helps individuals access the paperwork from the state showing they’ve met their parole requirements. They help felons petition judges to have their court fines reduced, or completely dismissed if the person may be considered indigent and help the individual submit voter registration forms to the state election commission.

References

Living people
1964 births
Tennessee State University
Tennessee State University alumni
Davidson County, Tennessee
Nashville, Tennessee